Tweed Coast Football Club, nicknamed Tigers,  is an Australian rules football club based on the Tweed Coast in northern New South Wales. The team currently competes in the Queensland Football Association Division 2 South.

Formed in 2009 the Tigers played in the Summerland AFL until it was merged into the Queensland State League in 2011. The Club experienced success early in its 2nd year under Coach Shane Shallue. Shallue Coached the club to Premierships in 2010, 2012, 2013 and 2015 before stepping aside in at the end of 2016.

In 2017, under the guidance of Coach Katie Pattison, the Club added a women's team to the playing group. The inaugural team, Co-Captained by Eleanor Crawley and Rachel Kelly, finished 3rd in 2017 and followed up with Grand Final appearances in 2018 and 2019 under Coach Shane Art..

Premierships (4)

See also
AFL NSW/ACT
Australian rules football in New South Wales

References

External links

Australian rules football clubs in New South Wales
Australian rules football clubs in Queensland
Sport in Tweed Heads, New South Wales
2009 establishments in Australia
Australian rules football clubs established in 2009